

White coat may refer to:
White coat, a knee-length overcoat/smock
Whitecoat, a newborn harp or grey seal with soft, white fur
Operation Whitecoat, a secret operation carried out by the US Army during the period 1954-1973
White coat ceremony, a relatively new ritual in some medical schools and pharmacy schools 
White coat hypertension, a phenomenon in which patients exhibit elevated blood pressure in a clinical setting but not when recorded by themselves at home
White Coat, Black Art, a Canadian radio documentary series
White-coated titi, Callicebus pallescens, a species of titi, a type of New World monkey, 
Intern Academy, a Canadian movie named White Coats in the United States
"White Coats", a song by Foxes from Glorious